After Love (French: Après l'amour) is a 1948 French drama film directed by Maurice Tourneur and starring Pierre Blanchar, Simone Renant and Giselle Pascal. The film is based on the 1924 play of the same title by Henri Duvernois and Pierre Wolff which has been adapted for the screen a number of times. Tourneur shot it in five weeks and came in under budget. It was the director's penultimate film, followed by Dilemma of Two Angels the same year.

The film's sets were designed by the art director's Paul-Louis Boutié and Guy de Gastyne.

Synopsis 
Betrayed by his wife, a teacher proceeds to have an affair with a young and pretty student. The two women both find themselves expecting a child. The girl dies during childbirth. In a spirit of revenge and to keep his real son, the scorned husband exchanges the babies.

Cast
 Pierre Blanchar as François Mézaule 
 Simone Renant as Nicole Mézaule  
 Giselle Pascal as Germaine  
 Gabrielle Fontan as Catou  
 Germaine Ledoyen as La soeur de Germaine / Sister  
 Nicole Chollet as La bonne 
 Claire Gérard as L'invitée  
 Marcel Melrac as Le propriètaire  
 René Hell as Le marchand de violettes  
 Paul Denneville as Le vieux journaliste  
 Jean-Jacques Duverger as Henri  
 Serge Canda 
 Fernand Fabre as Fournier 
 Léon Arvel as Le médecin  
 Cecil Baur 
 Alain Clairfond
 Lucien Dorval 
 Lucien Jeunesse 
 Lisette Lebon
 Lucienne Legrand 
 Michel Lemoine 
 Palmyre Levasseur as La voisine 
 Jacques Vertan

References

Bibliography 
 Waldman, Harry. Maurice Tourneur: The Life and Films. McFarland, 2001.

External links 
 

1948 films
French drama films
1948 drama films
1940s French-language films
Films directed by Maurice Tourneur
French films based on plays
Remakes of French films
French black-and-white films
1940s French films